Princequillo (1940–1964) was a Thoroughbred racehorse conceived in France and born in Ireland. He is known for his performances in long-distance races and his successes as a sire.

Background
His sire, Prince Rose, stood at the Haras de Cheffreville stud farm in France and was mated to the mare Cosquilla. When World War II broke out, the pregnant mare was shipped to Ireland, where she gave birth to Princequillo. Considering the danger from German bombing and the likelihood there would be no racing for some considerable time, Cosquilla's owners shipped her and her colt to the United States.

Racing career
In July 1942, Princequillo made his American racing debut. After a few races, he was purchased by Boone Hall Stable, owned by Prince Dimitri Djordjadze of Georgia and his American-born wife, Audrey Emery. They placed him under the care of future Hall of Fame trainer Horatio Luro. Princequillo won several important races at longer distances. He broke the Saratoga Race Course record for 1¾ miles and his performances were such that he is considered to be the best long-distance runner, with the exception of Kelso, in American racing history.

Stud career
Retired after his four-year-old racing season, Princequillo was purchased by Arthur B. Hancock and sent to the Hancock family's Ellerslie Stud in Albemarle County, Virginia and later to their Claiborne Farm near Paris, Kentucky. At stud, he sired 64 stakes winners and became one of the most important large-heart-producer stallions. 

Princequillo was the Leading sire in North America  for 1957 and 1958 and Leading broodmare sire from 1966 through 1970 and again in 1972 and 1973. Among his daughters' progeny are Mill Reef, Fort Marcy, High Echelon, Triple Crown winner Secretariat, and Secretariat's chief rival Sham. His son Prince John was Leading broodmare sire in 1979, 1980, 1982 and 1986. Princequillo's descendants include, Secretariat, Triple Crown Winner in 1973, Triple Crown winner Seattle Slew and U.S. Horse of the Year winners A.P. Indy and Cigar, the second greatest money winner of all time.  Zenyatta, John Henry, California Chrome and American Pharoah are also in his line of progeny. He garnered the nickname Mr. Fixit at stud thanks to his ability to sire foals with good confirmation and soundness.

Princequillo died of a heart attack in 1964 and is buried at Claiborne Farm.

Pedigree

References

 A history of Princequillo by Ellen Parker
 Stonerside Stable profile of Princequillo

External links
 Pedigree for Princequillo
 Pedigree for Prince John and stats
 Pedigree for Secretariat and stats
 Pedigree and racing stats for Seattle Slew
  Pedigree and racing stats for A.P. Indy
 Pedigree and racing stats for Cigar
 Pedigree and racing stats for Prince John

1940 racehorse births
1964 racehorse deaths
Racehorses bred in Ireland
Racehorses trained in the United States
Horse racing track record setters
United States Champion Thoroughbred Sires
British Champion Thoroughbred broodmare sires
Thoroughbred family 1-b
Chefs-de-Race